Clube de Autores (founded 2009) is a major self-publishing platform in Latin America, with a main focus on the Brazilian market. It is headquartered in Joinville, Santa Catarina, Brazil.

Clube de Autores claims to publish about 10% of the books in Brazil.

References

External links

 Official website

2009 establishments in Brazil
Book publishing companies of Brazil
Brazilian brands
Companies based in Joinville
Self-publishing companies
Publishing companies established in 2009